Keokuk National Cemetery is a United States National Cemetery located in the city of Keokuk in Lee County, Iowa. It encompasses , and as of 2021, had over 6,000 interments. It is administered by Rock Island National Cemetery.

History 
Keokuk National Cemetery was created in a separate, donated plot of Oakland Cemetery during the American Civil War as a place to inter veterans who died in the five military hospitals in the area. By the end of the Civil War, the cemetery had the interments of over 600 Union soldiers, and 8 Confederate prisoners of war.

In 1908 when Fort Yates, North Dakota was abandoned, the remains in its post cemetery were moved to Keokuk National Cemetery. In 1948, another post cemetery, in Des Moines, Iowa, also had its remains moved to the National Cemetery.

Keokuk National Cemetery was placed on the National Register of Historic Places in 1997.

Notable monuments 

The Unknown Soldiers monument was erected in 1912 by the Women's Corps of Keokuk in honor of 48 unknown soldiers buried at the cemetery. The monument is a large granite obelisk topped with the figure of a Union soldier standing at parade rest.

The American War Dads and Auxiliaries of Iowa erected a bronze wreath dedicated to Unknown Soldiers. Date of dedication is unknown.

Notable interments 
 Major General Samuel Ryan Curtis, American Civil War officer commanding, Battle of Pea Ridge, Battle of Westport.
 Private First Class John F. Thorson, Medal of Honor recipient for action in World War II.
 One Commonwealth war grave, of a Royal Canadian Air Force airman of World War II.

References

External links 
 National Cemetery Administration
 Keokuk National Cemetery
 
 
 
 
 CWGC: Keokuk National Cemetery

Buildings and structures in Keokuk, Iowa
Second Empire architecture in Iowa
1862 establishments in Iowa
Cemeteries in Iowa
Protected areas of Lee County, Iowa
United States national cemeteries
Iowa in the American Civil War
Cemeteries on the National Register of Historic Places in Iowa
National Register of Historic Places in Lee County, Iowa
Historic American Buildings Survey in Iowa
Historic American Landscapes Survey in Iowa
Commonwealth War Graves Commission cemeteries in the United States